Kenneth Fabricius (born 3 November 1981) is a Danish former professional footballer. He played as a striker.

Fabricius started playing for Silkeborg IF in 2000, and signed his first full-time professional contract with the club in 2002. In July 2004, Fabricius moved to Viborg FF, where he played for two years, before moving to SønderjyskE in the summer 2006.

References 

1981 births
Living people
Association football forwards
Danish men's footballers
Danish Superliga players
Danish 1st Division players
Danish 2nd Division players
Silkeborg IF players
Viborg FF players
SønderjyskE Fodbold players
Esbjerg fB players
People from Tønder Municipality
Sportspeople from the Region of Southern Denmark